Labeo camerunensis is a species of freshwater fish belonging to the genus Labeo. It is found in the Mungo River in western Cameroon.

References

camerunensis
Fish described in 1974